Geranium × magnificum, the purple cranesbill, is a species of hardy flowering herbaceous perennial plant in the genus Geranium, family Geraniaceae. The multiplication symbol × indicates that it is the result of hybridisation, in this case between Geranium platypetalum and Geranium ibericum. Violet-blue flowers with darker veins are borne relatively briefly in early summer. Extremely hardy, to below , it is suitable for cultivation throughout all temperate regions. This plant has gained the Royal Horticultural Society's Award of Garden Merit.

References

magnificum
Hybrid plants